Cocea is a Romanian surname. Notable people with the surname include:

Alice Cocéa (1899–1970), Romanian-born French actress and singer
Dina Cocea (1912–2008), Romanian actress
Dinu Cocea (1929–2013), Romanian actor, film director and screenwriter
N. D. Cocea (1880–1949), Romanian journalist, writer, critic and activist
Sofia Cocea (1839-1861), Moldavian, later Romanian essayist, poet and activist

Romanian-language surnames